The 7.5 cm leichtes Infanteriegeschütz 18 (7.5 cm le.IG 18) was an infantry support gun of the German Wehrmacht used during World War II.

History 
Development of the gun began in 1927, by Rheinmetall. The crew was protected by an armoured shield. There was a mountain gun variant, the 7.5 cm le.GebIG 18. For transport, the mountain variant could be broken down into six to ten packs, the heaviest weighing 74.9 kg. These were typically assigned at two to each mountain battalion. Six 7.5 cm le.IG 18F were manufactured in 1939. These were airborne guns, capable of being broken down into four 140 kg loads. The airborne variant had smaller wheels and no shield. There was also an infantry support gun, known as the 7.5 cm Infanteriegeschütz L/13 and designed as a replacement for the le.IG 18, which could be broken into four to six loads. However, though prototypes were tested, the German army felt that it did not improve on the existing design sufficiently to merit introduction and the army stayed with the earlier gun.

Statistics of the 7.5 cm le.IG 18 and 7.5 cm le.GebIG 18
Calibre: 75 mm (2.95 in)
Elevation: -10° to 73°
Muzzle Velocity (w/HE shell): 210 m/s (689 ft/s)
Range: 3,550 m (3,882 yd)
Traverse: 12°
Weight: 400 kg (882 lb)
Weight of the 7.5 cm le.GebIG 18: 440 kg (970 lb)
Weight of HE Shell: 6 kg (13.22 lb)
Weight of HC Shell: 3 kg (6.6 lb)

Statistics of the 7.5 cm IG L/13
Calibre: 75 mm (2.95 in)
Elevation: -5° to 43°
Muzzle Velocity: 305 m/s (1,000 ft/s)
Range: 5,100 m (5,577 yd)
Traverse: 50°
Weight: 375 kg (827 lb)
Weight of Shell: 6.35 kg (14 lb)

See also
7.5 cm Infanteriegeschütz 37
7.5 cm Infanteriegeschütz 42
Artillery
List of artillery

References
 Hogg, Ian V. German Artillery of World War Two. 2nd corrected edition. Mechanicsville, PA: Stackpole Books, 1997

External links
 

World War II artillery of Germany
World War II field artillery
Infantry guns
75 mm artillery
Military equipment introduced in the 1930s